Reactor is a physics engine developed by the Irish software company Havok for use in Autodesk 3ds Max. Reactor was fully integrated with 3ds Max from versions 5 to 2011. In 3ds Max 2012, Reactor was replaced by a PhysX-based engine called MassFX. Reactor was often used for realistic physics simulation that would be difficult or time-consuming to animate by hand.

Dynamics types
Reactor is capable of computing rigid body, soft body, cloth, and rope collisions. Reactor can also simulate dynamics of any supported type interacting with a water volume, with adjustable viscosity and depth.

Forces and constraints
Reactor includes a large number of forces that can be used in simulation, apart from the default gravity: springs, dashpots, motors, wind, fractures (breakable objects), and a "toy car" type, with definable body/axis/wheels. Reactor also has many constraints available, including hinges, point-to-point constraints, prismatic constraints, car-wheel constraints, point-to-path constraints, and ragdoll constraints to simulate a lifeless body. In addition, Reactor is compatible with Space Warp modifiers in 3ds Max.

References

3D graphics software
Software companies of Ireland
Computer physics engines
Intel software